The moment of inertia, otherwise known as the mass moment of inertia, angular mass, second moment of mass, or most accurately, rotational inertia, of a rigid body is a quantity that determines the torque needed for a desired angular acceleration about a rotational axis, akin to how mass determines the force needed for a desired acceleration. It depends on the body's mass distribution and the axis chosen, with larger moments requiring more torque to change the body's rate of rotation.

It is an extensive (additive) property: for a point mass the moment of inertia is simply the mass times the square of the perpendicular distance to the axis of rotation. The moment of inertia of a rigid composite system is the sum of the moments of inertia of its component subsystems (all taken about the same axis). Its simplest definition is the second moment of mass with respect to distance from an axis.

For bodies constrained to rotate in a plane, only their moment of inertia about an axis perpendicular to the plane, a scalar value, matters. For bodies free to rotate in three dimensions, their moments can be described by a symmetric 3-by-3 matrix, with a set of mutually perpendicular principal axes for which this matrix is diagonal and torques around the axes act independently of each other.

Introduction
When a body is free to rotate around an axis, torque must be applied to change its angular momentum. The amount of torque needed to cause any given angular acceleration (the rate of change in angular velocity) is proportional to the moment of inertia of the body. Moments of inertia may be expressed in units of kilogram metre squared (kg·m2) in SI units and pound-foot-second squared (lbf·ft·s2) in imperial or US units.

The moment of inertia plays the role in rotational kinetics that mass (inertia) plays in linear kinetics—both characterize the resistance of a body to changes in its motion. The moment of inertia depends on how mass is distributed around an axis of rotation, and will vary depending on the chosen axis. For an extended rigid body, the moment of inertia is just the sum of all the small pieces of mass multiplied by the square of their distances from the axis in rotation. For an extended body of a regular shape and uniform density, this summation sometimes produces a simple expression that depends on the dimensions, shape and total mass of the object.

In 1673 Christiaan Huygens introduced this parameter in his study of the oscillation of a body hanging from a pivot, known as a compound pendulum. The term moment of inertia ("momentum inertiae" in Latin) was introduced by Leonhard Euler in his book Theoria motus corporum solidorum seu rigidorum in 1765, and it is incorporated into Euler's second law.

The natural frequency of oscillation of a compound pendulum is obtained from the ratio of the torque imposed by gravity on the mass of the pendulum to the resistance to acceleration defined by the moment of inertia. Comparison of this natural frequency to that of a simple pendulum consisting of a single point of mass provides a mathematical formulation for moment of inertia of an extended body.

The moment of inertia also appears in momentum, kinetic energy, and in Newton's laws of motion for a rigid body as a physical parameter that combines its shape and mass. There is an interesting difference in the way moment of inertia appears in planar and spatial movement. Planar movement has a single scalar that defines the moment of inertia, while for spatial movement the same calculations yield a 3 × 3 matrix of moments of inertia, called the inertia matrix or inertia tensor.

The moment of inertia of a rotating flywheel is used in a machine to resist variations in applied torque to smooth its rotational output. The moment of inertia of an airplane about its longitudinal, horizontal and vertical axes determine how steering forces on the control surfaces of its wings, elevators and rudder(s) affect the plane's motions in roll, pitch and yaw.

Definition 
The moment of inertia is defined as the product of mass of section and the square of the distance between the reference axis and the centroid of the section. 

The moment of inertia  is also defined as the ratio of the net angular momentum  of a system to its angular velocity  around a principal axis, that is

If the angular momentum of a system is constant, then as the moment of inertia gets smaller, the angular velocity must increase. This occurs when spinning figure skaters pull in their outstretched arms or divers curl their bodies into a tuck position during a dive, to spin faster.

If the shape of the body does not change, then its moment of inertia appears in Newton's law of motion as the ratio of an applied torque  on a body to the angular acceleration  around a principal axis, that is

For a simple pendulum, this definition yields a formula for the moment of inertia  in terms of the mass  of the pendulum and its distance  from the pivot point as,

Thus, the moment of inertia of the pendulum depends on both the mass  of a body and its geometry, or shape, as defined by the distance  to the axis of rotation.

This simple formula generalizes to define moment of inertia for an arbitrarily shaped body as the sum of all the elemental point masses  each multiplied by the square of its perpendicular distance  to an axis . An arbitrary object's moment of inertia thus depends on the spatial distribution of its mass.

In general, given an object of mass , an effective radius  can be defined, dependent on a particular axis of rotation, with such a value that its moment of inertia around the axis is

where  is known as the radius of gyration around the axis.

Examples

Simple pendulum 
Mathematically, the moment of inertia of a simple pendulum is the ratio of the torque due to gravity about the pivot of a pendulum to its angular acceleration about that pivot point. For a simple pendulum this is found to be the product of the mass of the particle  with the square of its distance  to the pivot, that is

This can be shown as follows: The force of gravity on the mass of a simple pendulum generates a torque  around the axis perpendicular to the plane of the pendulum movement. Associated with this torque is an angular acceleration, of the string and mass around this axis. Since  the torque equation becomes:

where  is a unit vector perpendicular to the plane of the pendulum. The quantity  is the moment of inertia of this single mass around the pivot point.

The quantity  also appears in the angular momentum of a simple pendulum, which is calculated from the velocity  of the pendulum mass around the pivot, where  is the angular velocity of the mass about the pivot point. This angular momentum is given by

using a similar derivation to the previous equation.

Similarly, the kinetic energy of the pendulum mass is defined by the velocity of the pendulum around the pivot to yield

This shows that the quantity  is how mass combines with the shape of a body to define rotational inertia. The moment of inertia of an arbitrarily shaped body is the sum of the values  for all of the elements of mass in the body.

Compound pendulums 

A compound pendulum is a body formed from an assembly of particles of continuous shape that rotates rigidly around a pivot. Its moment of inertia is the sum of the moments of inertia of each of the particles that it is composed of. The natural frequency of a compound pendulum depends on its moment of inertia,

Measuring this frequency of oscillation over small angular displacements provides an effective way of measuring moment of inertia of a body.

Thus, to determine the moment of inertia of the body, simply suspend it from a convenient pivot point  so that it swings freely in a plane perpendicular to the direction of the desired moment of inertia, then measure its natural frequency or period of oscillation, to obtain

where  is the period (duration) of oscillation (usually averaged over multiple periods).

Center of oscillation
A simple pendulum that has the same natural frequency as a compound pendulum defines the length  from the pivot to a point called the center of oscillation of the compound pendulum. This point also corresponds to the center of percussion. The length  is determined from the formula,

or

The seconds pendulum, which provides the "tick" and "tock" of a grandfather clock, takes one second to swing from side-to-side. In this case, the distance to the center of oscillation, can be computed to be

Notice that the distance to the center of oscillation of the seconds pendulum must be adjusted to accommodate different values for the local acceleration of gravity. Kater's pendulum is a compound pendulum that uses this property to measure the local acceleration of gravity, and is called a gravimeter.

Measuring moment of inertia
The moment of inertia of a complex system such as a vehicle or airplane around its vertical axis can be measured by suspending the system from three points to form a trifilar pendulum. A trifilar pendulum is a platform supported by three wires designed to oscillate in torsion around its vertical centroidal axis. The period of oscillation of the trifilar pendulum yields the moment of inertia of the system.

Moment of inertia of area 
Moment of inertia of area is also known as the second moment of area.
These calculations are commonly used in civil engineering for structural design of beams and columns. Cross-sectional areas calculated for vertical moment of the x-axis  and horizontal moment of the y-axis .
Height (h) and breadth (b) are the linear measures, except for circles, which are effectively half-breadth derived,

Sectional areas moment calculated thus 
 Square: 
 Rectangular:    and; 
 Triangular:  
 Circular:

Motion in a fixed plane

Point mass 

The moment of inertia about an axis of a body is calculated by summing  for every particle in the body, where  is the perpendicular distance to the specified axis. To see how moment of inertia arises in the study of the movement of an extended body, it is convenient to consider a rigid assembly of point masses. (This equation can be used for axes that are not principal axes provided that it is understood that this does not fully describe the moment of inertia.)

Consider the kinetic energy of an assembly of  masses  that lie at the distances  from the pivot point , which is the nearest point on the axis of rotation. It is the sum of the kinetic energy of the individual masses,

This shows that the moment of inertia of the body is the sum of each of the  terms, that is

Thus, moment of inertia is a physical property that combines the mass and distribution of the particles around the rotation axis. Notice that rotation about different axes of the same body yield different moments of inertia.

The moment of inertia of a continuous body rotating about a specified axis is calculated in the same way, except with infinitely many point particles. Thus the limits of summation are removed, and the sum is written as follows:

Another expression replaces the summation with an integral,

Here, the function  gives the mass density at each point ,  is a vector perpendicular to the axis of rotation and extending from a point on the rotation axis to a point  in the solid, and the integration is evaluated over the volume  of the body . The moment of inertia of a flat surface is similar with the mass density being replaced by its areal mass density with the integral evaluated over its area.

Note on second moment of area: The moment of inertia of a body moving in a plane and the second moment of area of a beam's cross-section are often confused. The moment of inertia of a body with the shape of the cross-section is the second moment of this area about the -axis perpendicular to the cross-section, weighted by its density. This is also called the polar moment of the area, and is the sum of the second moments about the - and -axes. The stresses in a beam are calculated using the second moment of the cross-sectional area around either the -axis or -axis depending on the load.

Examples 

The moment of inertia of a compound pendulum constructed from a thin disc mounted at the end of a thin rod that oscillates around a pivot at the other end of the rod, begins with the calculation of the moment of inertia of the thin rod and thin disc about their respective centers of mass.

 The moment of inertia of a thin rod with constant cross-section  and density  and with length  about a perpendicular axis through its center of mass is determined by integration.  Align the -axis with the rod and locate the origin its center of mass at the center of the rod, then  where  is the mass of the rod.
 The moment of inertia of a thin disc of constant thickness , radius , and density  about an axis through its center and perpendicular to its face (parallel to its axis of rotational symmetry) is determined by integration.
 The moment of inertia of the compound pendulum is now obtained by adding the moment of inertia of the rod and the disc around the pivot point  as,  where  is the length of the pendulum.  Notice that the parallel axis theorem is used to shift the moment of inertia from the center of mass to the pivot point of the pendulum.

A list of moments of inertia formulas for standard body shapes provides a way to obtain the moment of inertia of a complex body as an assembly of simpler shaped bodies. The parallel axis theorem is used to shift the reference point of the individual bodies to the reference point of the assembly.

As one more example, consider the moment of inertia of a solid sphere of constant density about an axis through its center of mass. This is determined by summing the moments of inertia of the thin discs that can form the sphere whose centers are along the axis chosen for consideration. If the surface of the ball is defined by the equation

then the square of the radius  of the disc at the cross-section  along the -axis is

Therefore, the moment of inertia of the ball is the sum of the moments of inertia of the discs along the -axis,

where  is the mass of the sphere.

Rigid body 

If a mechanical system is constrained to move parallel to a fixed plane, then the rotation of a body in the system occurs around an axis  perpendicular to this plane. In this case, the moment of inertia of the mass in this system is a scalar known as the polar moment of inertia. The definition of the polar moment of inertia can be obtained by considering momentum, kinetic energy and Newton's laws for the planar movement of a rigid system of particles.

If a system of  particles, are assembled into a rigid body, then the momentum of the system can be written in terms of positions relative to a reference point , and absolute velocities :

For planar movement the angular velocity vector is directed along the unit vector  which is perpendicular to the plane of movement. Introduce the unit vectors  from the reference point  to a point , and the unit vector , so

This defines the relative position vector and the velocity vector for the rigid system of the particles moving in a plane.

Note on the cross product: When a body moves parallel to a ground plane, the trajectories of all the points in the body lie in planes parallel to this ground plane. This means that any rotation that the body undergoes must be around an axis perpendicular to this plane. Planar movement is often presented as projected onto this ground plane so that the axis of rotation appears as a point. In this case, the angular velocity and angular acceleration of the body are scalars and the fact that they are vectors along the rotation axis is ignored. This is usually preferred for introductions to the topic. But in the case of moment of inertia, the combination of mass and geometry benefits from the geometric properties of the cross product. For this reason, in this section on planar movement the angular velocity and accelerations of the body are vectors perpendicular to the ground plane, and the cross product operations are the same as used for the study of spatial rigid body movement.

Angular momentum
The angular momentum vector for the planar movement of a rigid system of particles is given by

Use the center of mass  as the reference point so

and define the moment of inertia relative to the center of mass  as

then the equation for angular momentum simplifies to

The moment of inertia  about an axis perpendicular to the movement of the rigid system and through the center of mass is known as the polar moment of inertia. Specifically, it is the second moment of mass with respect to the orthogonal distance from an axis (or pole).

For a given amount of angular momentum, a decrease in the moment of inertia results in an increase in the angular velocity. Figure skaters can change their moment of inertia by pulling in their arms. Thus, the angular velocity achieved by a skater with outstretched arms results in a greater angular velocity when the arms are pulled in, because of the reduced moment of inertia. A figure skater is not, however, a rigid body.

Kinetic energy

The kinetic energy of a rigid system of particles moving in the plane is given by

Let the reference point be the center of mass  of the system so the second term becomes zero, and introduce the moment of inertia  so the kinetic energy is given by

The moment of inertia  is the polar moment of inertia of the body.

Newton's laws

Newton's laws for a rigid system of  particles, can be written in terms of a resultant force and torque at a reference point , to yield

where  denotes the trajectory of each particle.

The kinematics of a rigid body yields the formula for the acceleration of the particle  in terms of the position  and acceleration  of the reference particle as well as the angular velocity vector  and angular acceleration vector  of the rigid system of particles as,

For systems that are constrained to planar movement, the angular velocity and angular acceleration vectors are directed along  perpendicular to the plane of movement, which simplifies this acceleration equation. In this case, the acceleration vectors can be simplified by introducing the unit vectors  from the reference point  to a point  and the unit vectors , so

This yields the resultant torque on the system as

Use the center of mass  as the reference point and define the moment of inertia relative to the center of mass , then the equation for the resultant torque simplifies to

Motion in space of a rigid body, and the inertia matrix
The scalar moments of inertia appear as elements in a matrix when a system of particles is assembled into a rigid body that moves in three-dimensional space. This inertia matrix appears in the calculation of the angular momentum, kinetic energy and resultant torque of the rigid system of particles.

Let the system of  particles,  be located at the coordinates  with velocities  relative to a fixed reference frame. For a (possibly moving) reference point , the relative positions are

and the (absolute) velocities are

Angular momentum
Note that the cross product can be equivalently written as matrix multiplication by combining the first operand and the operator into a skew-symmetric matrix, constructed from the components of :

The inertia matrix is constructed by considering the angular momentum, with the reference point  of the body chosen to be the center of mass :

where the terms containing  sum to zero by the definition of center of mass.

Then, the skew-symmetric matrix  obtained from the relative position vector , can be used to define,

where  defined by

is the symmetric inertia matrix of the rigid system of particles measured relative to the center of mass .

Kinetic energy
The kinetic energy of a rigid system of particles can be formulated in terms of the center of mass and a matrix of mass moments of inertia of the system. Let the system of  particles  be located at the coordinates  with velocities , then the kinetic energy is

where  is the position vector of a particle relative to the center of mass.

This equation expands to yield three terms

Since the center of mass is defined by 

, the second term in this equation is zero. Introduce the skew-symmetric matrix  so the kinetic energy becomes

Thus, the kinetic energy of the rigid system of particles is given by

Resultant torque
The inertia matrix appears in the application of Newton's second law to a rigid assembly of particles. The resultant torque on this system is,

where  is the acceleration of the particle . The kinematics of a rigid body yields the formula for the acceleration of the particle  in terms of the position  and acceleration  of the reference point, as well as the angular velocity vector  and angular acceleration vector  of the rigid system as,

Use the center of mass  as the reference point, and introduce the skew-symmetric matrix  to represent the cross product , to obtain

The calculation uses the identity

obtained from the Jacobi identity for the triple cross product as shown in the proof below:

Thus, the resultant torque on the rigid system of particles is given by

where  is the inertia matrix relative to the center of mass.

Parallel axis theorem

The inertia matrix of a body depends on the choice of the reference point. There is a useful relationship between the inertia matrix relative to the center of mass  and the inertia matrix relative to another point . This relationship is called the parallel axis theorem.

Consider the inertia matrix  obtained for a rigid system of particles measured relative to a reference point , given by

Let  be the center of mass of the rigid system, then

where  is the vector from the center of mass  to the reference point . Use this equation to compute the inertia matrix,

Distribute over the cross product to obtain

The first term is the inertia matrix  relative to the center of mass. The second and third terms are zero by definition of the center of mass .

The result is the parallel axis theorem,

where  is the vector from the center of mass  to the reference point .

Note on the minus sign: By using the skew symmetric matrix of position vectors relative to the reference point, the inertia matrix of each particle has the form , which is similar to the  that appears in planar movement. However, to make this to work out correctly a minus sign is needed.

Scalar moment of inertia in a plane
The scalar moment of inertia, of a body about a specified axis whose direction is specified by the unit vector  and passes through the body at a point  is as follows:

This is derived as follows. Let a rigid assembly of  particles, have coordinates . Choose  as a reference point and compute the moment of inertia around a line L defined by the unit vector  through the reference point , .

To relate this scalar moment of inertia to the inertia matrix of the body, introduce the skew-symmetric matrix  such that , then we have the identity

noting that  is a unit vector.

The magnitude squared of the perpendicular vector is

The simplification of this equation uses the triple scalar product identity

where the dot and the cross products have been interchanged.

Thus, the moment of inertia around the line  through  in the direction  is obtained from the calculation

where  is the moment of inertia matrix of the system relative to the reference point .

This shows that the inertia matrix can be used to calculate the moment of inertia of a body around any specified rotation axis in the body.

Inertia tensor 

For the same object, different axes of rotation will have different moments of inertia about those axes. In general, the moments of inertia are not equal unless the object is symmetric about all axes. The moment of inertia tensor is a convenient way to summarize all moments of inertia of an object with one quantity. It may be calculated with respect to any point in space, although for practical purposes the center of mass is most commonly used.

Definition 

For a rigid object of  point masses , the moment of inertia tensor is given by

Its components are defined as

where
  is the vector to the point mass  from the point about which the tensor is calculated and
  is the Kronecker delta.

Note that, by the definition,  is a symmetric tensor.

The diagonal elements are more succinctly written as

while the off-diagonal elements, also called the products of inertia, are

Here  denotes the moment of inertia around the -axis when the objects are rotated around the x-axis,  denotes the moment of inertia around the -axis when the objects are rotated around the -axis, and so on.

These quantities can be generalized to an object with distributed mass, described by a mass density function, in a similar fashion to the scalar moment of inertia. One then has

where  is their outer product, E3 is the 3×3 identity matrix, and V is a region of space completely containing the object.

Alternatively it can also be written in terms of the angular momentum operator :

The inertia tensor can be used in the same way as the inertia matrix to compute the scalar moment of inertia about an arbitrary axis in the direction ,

where the dot product is taken with the corresponding elements in the component tensors.

and can be interpreted as the moment of inertia around the -axis when the object rotates around the -axis.

The components of tensors of degree two can be assembled into a matrix. For the inertia tensor this matrix is given by,

Alternate inertia convention 
There are some CAD and CAE applications such as SolidWorks, Unigraphics NX/Siemens NX and MSC Adams that use an alternate convention for the products of inertia. According to this convention, the minus sign is removed from the product of inertia formulas and instead inserted in the inertia matrix:

Determine inertia convention (Principal axes method) 
If one has the inertia data  without knowing which inertia convention that has been used, it can be determined if one also has the principal axes. With the principal axes method, one makes inertia matrices from the following two assumptions: 

 The standard inertia convention has been used .  
 The alternate inertia convention has been used . 
Next, one calculates the eigenvectors for the two matrices. The matrix whose eigenvectors are parallel to the principal axes corresponds to the inertia convention that has been used.

Derivation of the tensor components 

The moment of inertia on the axis is

Rewrite the equation using matrix transpose:

where E3 is the 3×3 identity matrix.

This leads to a tensor formula for the moment of inertia

For multiple particles, we need only recall that the moment of inertia is additive in order to see that this formula is correct.

Inertia tensor of translation 

Let  be the inertia tensor of a body calculated at its center of mass, and  be the displacement vector of the body. The inertia tensor of the translated body respect to its original center of mass is given by:

Inertia tensor of rotation 

Let  be the matrix that represents a body's rotation. The inertia tensor of the rotated body is given by:

Inertia matrix in different reference frames 
The use of the inertia matrix in Newton's second law assumes its components are computed relative to axes parallel to the inertial frame and not relative to a body-fixed reference frame. This means that as the body moves the components of the inertia matrix change with time. In contrast, the components of the inertia matrix measured in a body-fixed frame are constant.

Body frame
Let the body frame inertia matrix relative to the center of mass be denoted , and define the orientation of the body frame relative to the inertial frame by the rotation matrix , such that,

where vectors  in the body fixed coordinate frame have coordinates  in the inertial frame. Then, the inertia matrix of the body measured in the inertial frame is given by

Notice that  changes as the body moves, while  remains constant.

Principal axes
Measured in the body frame, the inertia matrix is a constant real symmetric matrix. A real symmetric matrix has the eigendecomposition into the product of a rotation matrix  and a diagonal matrix , given by

where

This result was first shown by J. J. Sylvester (1852), and is a form of Sylvester's law of inertia. The principal axis with the highest moment of inertia is sometimes called the figure axis or axis of figure.

A toy top is an example of a rotating rigid body, and the word top is used in names the types of types of rigid bodies.  When all principal moments of inertia are distinct, the principal axes through center of mass are uniquely specified and the rigid body is called an asymmetric top. If two principal moments are the same, the rigid body is called a symmetric top and there is no unique choice for the two corresponding principal axes. If all three principal moments are the same, the rigid body is called a spherical top (although it need not be spherical) and any axis can be considered a principal axis, meaning that the moment of inertia is the same about any axis.

The principal axes are often aligned with the object's symmetry axes. If a rigid body has an axis of symmetry of order , meaning it is symmetrical under rotations of  about the given axis, that axis is a principal axis. When , the rigid body is a symmetric top. If a rigid body has at least two symmetry axes that are not parallel or perpendicular to each other, it is a spherical top, for example, a cube or any other Platonic solid.

The motion of vehicles is often described in terms of yaw, pitch, and roll which usually correspond approximately to rotations about the three principal axes. If the vehicle has bilateral symmetry then one of the principal axes will correspond exactly to the transverse (pitch) axis.

A practical example of this mathematical phenomenon is the routine automotive task of balancing a tire, which basically means adjusting the distribution of mass of a car wheel such that its principal axis of inertia is aligned with the axle so the wheel does not wobble.

Rotating molecules are also classified as asymmetric, symmetric, or spherical tops, and the structure of their rotational spectra is different for each type.

Ellipsoid

The moment of inertia matrix in body-frame coordinates is a quadratic form that defines a surface in the body called Poinsot's ellipsoid. Let  be the inertia matrix relative to the center of mass aligned with the principal axes, then the surface

or

defines an ellipsoid in the body frame. Write this equation in the form,

to see that the semi-principal diameters of this ellipsoid are given by

Let a point  on this ellipsoid be defined in terms of its magnitude and direction, where  is a unit vector. Then the relationship presented above, between the inertia matrix and the scalar moment of inertia  around an axis in the direction , yields

Thus, the magnitude of a point  in the direction  on the inertia ellipsoid is

See also 
 Central moment
 List of moments of inertia
 Planar lamina
 Rotational energy
 Moment of inertia factor

References

External links 

 Angular momentum and rigid-body rotation in two and three dimensions
 Lecture notes on rigid-body rotation and moments of inertia
 The moment of inertia tensor
 An introductory lesson on moment of inertia: keeping a vertical pole not falling down (Java simulation)
 Tutorial on finding moments of inertia, with problems and solutions on various basic shapes
 Notes on mechanics of manipulation: the angular inertia tensor

Physical quantities
Rigid bodies
Rotation
Articles containing video clips
Moment (physics)
 Easy to use and Free Moment of Inertia Calculator online